Al Gentry (born October 12, 1964) is an American politician and a Democratic member of the Kentucky House of Representatives representing District 46 since January 2017.

References 

1964 births
Living people
Democratic Party members of the Kentucky House of Representatives
21st-century American politicians
University of Louisville alumni
University of Kentucky alumni